The Salar people are a Turkic ethnic minority of China who largely speak the Salar language, an Oghuz language. The Salar people numbered 130,607 people in the last census of 2010.

The Salars live mostly in the Qinghai-Gansu border region, on both sides of the Yellow River, namely in Xunhua Salar Autonomous County, Hualong Hui Autonomous County of Qinghai and the adjacent Jishishan Bonan, Dongxiang and Salar Autonomous County of Gansu and in some parts of Henan and Shanxi. There are also Salars in Northern Xinjiang (in the Ili Kazakh Autonomous Prefecture).

They are a patriarchal agricultural society and are predominantly Muslim.

Salars live in Gansu's Lintan County and Xining, Linxia County and Qinghai's Hualong Hui autonomous county and Xunhua Salar autonomous county.

History

Origin
According to Salar tradition and Chinese chronics, the Salars are the descendants of the Salur tribe, belonging to the Oghuz Turk tribe of the Western Turkic Khaganate. During the Tang dynasty, the Salur tribe dwelt within China's borders and lived since then in the Qinghai-Gansu border region. Over the centuries, they mixed with neighboring Tibetans, Hui, Han Chinese and Mongols, developing the distinctive modern Salar language and culture.

Islamic legend
According to a legend, two brothers Haraman and Ahman, possibly forefathers of the present day Salar tribe once lived in the Samarkand area. They were highly ranked at local Islamic mosques, which led to persecution from local rulers. The two brothers fled along with eighteen members of the tribe on a white camel with water, soil and a Quran before heading east. The group trekked through the northern route of the Tian Shan mountain ranges into the Jiayuguan pass and passing through the present day Suzhou District, Ganzhou District, Ningxia, Qinzhou District, Gangu County and eventually stopping at the present Xiahe County. Later, another forty people from Samarkand joined the group. The group passed through the southern route of the Tian Shan mountain ranges and entered Qinghai. They arrived at the present Guide County and twelve of them settled there.

The Koran, the two brothers brought on their journey to China is to this day still preserved in Xunhua at Jiezi Mosque. The Nanjing Museum has repaired the Koran to protect it from decay.

Ming dynasty
The Salar clan leaders voluntarily capitulated to the Ming dynasty around 1370. The chief of the four upper clans around this time was Han Baoyuan and the Ming government granted him office of centurion, it was at this time the people of his four clans took Han as their surname. The other chief Han Shanba of the four lower Salar clans got the same office from the Ming government and his clans were the ones who took Ma as their surname. The ethnogenesis of the Salar started from when they pledged allegiance to the Ming dynasty under their leader Han Bao. Han Bao's father was Omar and Omar's father was Haraman, who led the Salars on their journey from Central Asia to China.

After the Salars moved to Xunhua, they converted Tibetan women to Islam and the Tibetan women were taken as wives by Salar men. A Salar wedding ritual where grains and milk were scattered on a horse by the bride was influenced by Tibetans. After they moved into northern Tibet, the Salars originally practiced the same Gedimu (Gedem) variant of Sunni Islam as the Hui people and adopted Hui practices like using the Hui Jingtang Jiaoyu Islamic education during the Ming dynasty which derived from Yuan dynasty Arabic and Persian primers. One of the Salar primers was called "Book of Diverse Studies" (雜學本本 Zaxue Benben) in Chinese. The version of Sunni Islam practiced by Salars was greatly impacted by Salars marrying with Hui who had settled in Xunhua. The Hui introduced new Naqshbandi Sufi orders like Jahriyya and Khafiyya to the Salars and eventually these Sufi orders led to sectarian violence involving Qing soldiers (Han, Tibetans and Mongols) and the Sufis which included the Chinese Muslims (Salars and Hui). Ma Laichi brought the Khafiyya Naqshbandi order to the Salars and the Salars followed the Flowered mosque order (花寺門宦) of the Khafiyya. He preached silent dhikr and simplified Qur'an readings bringing the Arabic text Mingsha jing (明沙經, 明沙勒, 明沙爾 Minshar jing) to China.

Tibetan women were the original wives of the first Salars to arrive in the region as recorded in Salar oral history. The Tibetans agreed to let their Tibetan women marry Salar men after putting up several demands to accommodate cultural and religious differences. Hui and Salar intermarry due to cultural similarities and following the same Islamic religion. Older Salars married Tibetan women but younger Salars prefer marrying other Salars. Han and Salar mostly do not intermarry with each other unlike marriages of Tibetan women to Salar men. Salars, however, use Han surnames. Salar patrilineal clans are much more limited than Han patrilinial clans in how much they deal with culture, society or religion. Salar men often marry a lot of non-Salar women and they took Tibetan women as wives after migrating to Xunhua according to historical accounts and folk histories. Salars almost exclusively took non-Salar women as wives like Tibetan women while never giving Salar women to non-Salar men in marriage except for Hui men who were allowed to marry Salar women. As a result Salars are heavily mixed with other ethnicities.

Salars in Qinghai live on both banks of the Yellow river, south and north, the northern ones are called Hualong or Bayan Salars while the southern ones are called Xunhua Salars. The region north of the Yellow river is a mix of discontinuous Salar and Tibetan villages while the region south of the yellow river is solidly Salar with no gaps in between, since Hui and Salars pushed the Tibetans on the south region out earlier. Tibetan women who converted to Islam were taken as wives on both banks of the river by Salar men. The term for maternal uncle (ajiu) is used for Tibetans by Salars since the Salars have maternal Tibetan ancestry. Tibetans witness Salar life passages in Kewa, a Salar village and Tibetan butter tea is consumed by Salars there as well. Other Tibetan cultural influences like Salar houses having four corners with a white stone on them became part of Salar culture as long as they were not prohibited by Islam. Hui people started assimilating and intermarrying with Salars in Xunhua after migrating there from Hezhou in Gansu due to the Chinese Ming dynasty ruling the Xunhua Salars after 1370 and Hezhou officials governed Xunhua. Many Salars with the Ma surname appear to be of Hui descent since a lot of Salars now have the Ma surname while in the beginning the majority of Salars had the Han surname. Some example of Hezhou Hui who became Salars are the Chenjia (Chen family) and Majia (Ma family) villages in Altiuli where the Chen and Ma families are Salars who admit their Hui ancestry. Marriage ceremonies, funerals, birth rites and prayer were shared by both Salar and Hui as they intermarriaed and shared the same religion since more and more Hui moved into the Salar areas on both banks of the Yellow river. Many Hui women married Salar men and eventually it became far more popular for Hui and Salar to intermarry due to both being Muslims than to non-Muslim Han, Mongols and Tibetans. The Salar language and culture, however, was highly impacted in the 14th-16th centuries in their original ethnogenesis by marriage with Mongol and Tibetan non-Muslims with many loanwords and grammatical influence by Mongol and Tibetan in their language. Salars were multilingual in Salar and Mongol and then in Chinese and Tibetan as they trade extensively in the Ming, Qing and Republic of China periods on the yellow river in Ningxia and Lanzhou in Gansu.

Salars and Tibetans both use the term maternal uncle (ajiu in Salar and Chinese, azhang in Tibetan) to refer to each other, referring to the fact that Salars are descendants of Tibetan women marrying Salar men. After using these terms they often repeat the historical account how Tibetan women were married by 2,000 Salar men who were the First Salars to migrate to Qinghai. These terms illustrate that Salars were viewed separately from the Hui by Tibetans. According to legend, the marriages between Tibetan women and Salar men came after a compromise between demands by a Tibetan chief and the Salar migrants. The Salar say Wimdo valley was ruled by a Tibetan and he demanded the Salars follow 4 rules in order to marry Tibetan women. He asked them to install on their houses's four corners Tibetan Buddhist prayer flags, to pray with Tibetan Buddhist prayer wheels with the Buddhist mantra om mani padma hum and to bow before statues of Buddha. The Salars refused those demands saying they did not recite mantras or bow to statues since they believed in only one creator god and were Muslims. They compromised on the flags in houses by putting stones on their houses' corners instead of Tibetan Buddhist prayer flags. Some Tibetans do not differentiate between Salar and Hui due to their Islamic religion. In 1996, Wimdo township only had one Salar because Tibetans whined about the Muslim call to prayer and a mosque built in the area in the early 1990s so they kicked out most of the Salars from the region. Salars were bilingual in Salar and Tibetan due to intermarriage with Tibetan women and trading. It is far less likely for a Tibetan to speak Salar. Tibetan women in Xiahe also married Muslim men who came there as traders before the 1930s.

In Eastern Qinghai and Gansu, there were cases of Tibetan women who stayed in their Buddhist Lamaist religion while marrying Chinese Muslim men and they would have different sons who would be Buddhist and Muslims, the Buddhist sons became Lamas while the other sons were Muslims. Hui and Tibetans married Salars.

The Kargan Tibetans, who live next to the Salar, have mostly become Muslim due to the Salars. The Salar oral tradition recalls that it was around 1370 in which they came from Samarkand to China. The later Qing dynasty and Republic of China Salar General Han Youwen was born to a Tibetan woman named Ziliha (孜力哈) and a Salar father named Aema (阿額瑪).

The Salars were permitted an enormous amount of autonomy and self-rule by the Ming dynasty, which gave them command of taxes, military and the courts.

The Ming and Qing dynasties often mobilized Salars into their militaries as soldiers, with the Ming government recruiting them at 17 different times for service and the Qing government at five different times.

Qing dynasty
In the 1670s, the Kashgarian Sufi master Āfāq Khoja (and, possibly, his father Muhammad Yūsuf even earlier) preached among the Salars, introducing Sufism into their community. In the mid-18th century, one of Āfāq Khoja's spiritual descendants, Ma Laichi, spread his teaching, known as Khufiyya among the Salars, just as he did among their Chinese-speaking and Tibetan-speaking neighbors.

The Manchu Kangxi emperor incited anti-Muslim sentiment among the Mongols of Qinghai (Kokonor) in order to gain support against the Dzungar Oirat Mongol leader Galdan. Kangxi claimed that Chinese Muslims inside China such as Turkic Muslims in Qinghai (Kokonor) were plotting with Galdan, who he falsely claimed converted to Islam. Kangxi falsely claimed that Galdan had spurned and turned his back on Buddhism and the Dalai Lama and that he was plotting to install a Muslim as ruler of China after invading it in a conspiracy with Chinese Muslims. Kangxi also distrusted Muslims of Turfan and Hami.

Throughout the 1760s and 1770s, another Chinese Sufi master, Ma Mingxin, was spreading his version of Sufi teaching, known as Jahriyya throughout the Gansu province (which then included Salar's homeland in today's Qinghai). Many Salars became adherents of Jahriyya, or the "New Teaching", as the Qing government officials dubbed it (in opposition to the "Old Teaching", i.e. both the Khufiyya Sufi order and the non-Sufi Gedimu Islam). While the external differences between the Khufiyya and the Jahriyya would look comparatively trivial to an outsider (the two orders were most known for, respectively, the silent or vocal dhikr, i.e. invocation of the name of God), the conflict between their adherents often became violent.

Sectarian violence between the Jahriyya and Khufiyya broke out repeatedly until the major episode of violence in 1781. In 1781, the authorities, concerned with the spread of the "subversive" "New Teaching" among the Salars, whom they (perhaps unfairly) viewed as a fierce and troublesome lot, arrested Ma Mingxin and sent an expedition to the Salar community of Xunhua County to round up his supporters there. In the Jahriyya revolt sectarian violence between two suborders of the Naqshbandi Sufis, the Jahriyya Sufi Muslims and their rivals, the Khafiyya Sufi Muslims, led to a Jahriyya Sufi Muslim rebellion which the Qing dynasty in China crushed with the help of the Khafiyya Sufi Muslims.

The Jahriyya Salars of Xunhua, led by their ahong (imam) nicknamed Su Sishisan ("Su Forty-three", 苏四十三), responded by killing the government officials and destroying their task force at the place called Baizhuangzi and then rushed across the Hezhou region to the walls of Lanzhou, where Ma Mingxin was imprisoned. When the besieged officials brought Ma Mingxin, wearing chains, to the Lanzhou city wall, to show him to the rebels, Su's Salars at once showed respect and devotion to their imprisoned leaders. Scared officials took Ma down from the wall and beheaded him right away. Su's Salars tried attacking the Lanzhou city walls, but, not having any siege equipment, failed to penetrate into the walled city. The Salar fighters (whose strength at the time is estimated by historians to be in 1,000-2,000 range) then set up a fortified camp on a hill south of Lanzhou. Some Han Chinese, Hui and Dongxiang (Santa) joined the Salar in the rebellion against the Qing.

To deal with the rebels, Imperial Commissioners Agui and Heshen were sent to Lanzhou. Unable to dislodge the Salars from their fortified camp with his regular troops, Agui sent the "incompetent" Heshen back to Beijing and recruited Alashan Mongols and Southern Gansu Tibetans to aid the Lanzhou garrison. After a three months' siege of the rebel camp and cutting off the Salars' water supply, Agui's joint forces destroyed the Jahriya rebels; Su and all his fighters were all killed in the final battle. Overall, it is said that as much as 40% of their entire population was killed in the revolt.

As late as 1937, a folk ballad was still told by the Salars about the rebellion of 1781, and Su Sishisan suicidal decision to go to war against the Qing Empire.

The Qing government deported some of the Salar Jahriyya rebels to the Ili valley which is in modern-day Xinjiang. Today, a community of a few thousand Salars speaking a distinct dialect of Salar still live there. Salar migrants from Amdo (Qinghai) came to settle the region as religious exiles, migrants and as soldiers enlisted in the Qing army to fight rebels in Ili, often following the Hui. The distinctive dialect of the Ili Salar differs from the other Salar dialects because the neighboring Kazakh and Uyghur languages in Ili influenced it. The Ili Salar population numbers around 4,000 people. There have been instances of misunderstanding between speakers of Ili Salar and Qinghai Salar due to the divergence of the dialects. The differences between the two dialect result in a "clear isogloss".

In the 1880s-1890s, sectarian strife was rife in the Salar community of Xunhua again. This time, the conflict was among two factions of the Hua Si menhuan (order) of the Khufiyya and in 1895 the local Qing officials ended up siding with the reformist faction within the order. Although the factional conflict was evident not only in Salar Xunhua but in Hui Hezhou as well, the troops were first sent to Xunhua - which again precipitated a Salar rebellion, which spread to many Hui and Dongxiang communities of Gansu too. It turned into the Dungan Revolt (1895), which was crushed by a loyalist Hui army.

The Hui people, also known as the "white capped HuiHui", used incense during worship, while the Salar, also known as "black capped HuiHui", considered this to be a heathen ritual and denounced it.

Modern era

Salars served in general Dong Fuxiang's Kansu Braves army against the foreign western and Japanese Eight Nation Alliance in the Boxer rebellion. Other Muslims like Dongxiang, Bonan and Hui also served in the Kansu-Tibetan Braves.

Like other Muslims in China, the Salars served extensively in the Chinese military. It was said that they and the Dongxiang were given to "eating rations", a reference to military service.

During the Second Sino-Japanese War, Salar troops and officers served in the Qinghai army of the Muslim general Ma Biao and they battled extensively in bloody battles against the Imperial Japanese Army in Henan province. In 1937, during the Battle of Beiping–Tianjin the Chinese government was notified by Muslim General Ma Bufang of the Ma clique that he was prepared to bring the fight to the Japanese in a telegram message. Immediately after the Marco Polo Bridge Incident, Ma Bufang arranged for a cavalry division under Ma Biao to be sent east to battle the Japanese. Salars made up the majority of the first cavalry division which was sent by Ma Bufang. The Qinghai Chinese, Salar, Chinese Muslim, Dongxiang and Tibetan troops Ma Biao led fought to the death against the Japanese or committed suicide refusing to be taken as prisoner. In September 1940, when the Japanese made an offensive against the Muslim Qinghai troops, they ambushed them and killed so many of them the Japanese soldiers that they were forced to retreat. The Japanese could not even pick up their dead, they instead cut an arm from their corpses limbs for cremation to send back to Japan. The Japanese did not dare make an offensive like that again.

Han Youwen, a Salar general in the National Revolutionary Army and member of the Kuomintang (Nationalist Party), directed the defense of the city of Xining during air raids by Japanese planes. Han survived an aerial bombardment by Japanese planes in Xining while he was being directed via telephone from Ma Bufang, who hid in an air raid shelter in a military barracks. The bombing resulted in human flesh splattering a Blue Sky with a White Sun flag and Han being buried in rubble. Han Youwen was dragged out of the rubble while bleeding and he managed to grab a machine gun while he was limping and fired back at the Japanese warplanes. He later defected to the Communist People's Liberation Army, serving in numerous military positions and as vice chairman of Xinjiang. He had led Chinese Muslim forces against Soviet and Mongol forces in the Pei-ta-shan Incident.

Culture

The Salar had their own unique kinship clanships. Matchmakers and parents arrange marriages among the Salar. The Salar are an entrepreneurial people, going into multiple businesses and industries. They practice agriculture and horticulture. They cultivate chili and pepper in their gardens. Buckwheat, millet, wheat and barley are among the crops they grow. Other important crops include melons, grapes, apples, apricots and walnuts. A few Salar raise livestock and the local timber industry is also another source of income for some villages.

Hui general Ma Fuxiang recruited Salars into his army, and said they moved to China since the Tang dynasty. His classification of them is in two groups, five inner clans, eight outer clans. Ma said the outer group speaks Tibetan, no longer knowing their native language. Salars only married other Salars. Uighurs have said that they were unable to understand the Salar language.

Ma and Han are the two most widespread names among the Salar. Ma is a Salar surname for the same reason it is a common Hui surname, Ma substitutes for Muhammad. The upper four clans of the Salar assumed the surname Han and lived west of Xunhua. One of these Salar surnamed Han was Han Yimu, a Salar officer who served under General Ma Bufang. He fought in the Kuomintang Islamic Insurgency in China (1950–1958), leading Salars in a revolt in 1952 and 1958. Ma Bufang, enlisted Salars as officers in his army by exclusively targeting Xunhua and Hualong as areas to draw officers from.

18.69 years was the average first marriage age for Salar women in 2000 while Tibetan women were married at 23.8 years on average in 1990.

Clothing
The typical clothing of the Salar is very similar to the Hui people in the region. The men are commonly bearded and dress in white shirts and white or black skullcaps. The traditional clothing for men is jackets and gowns. The young single women are accustomed to dressing in Chinese dress of bright colors. The married women utilize the traditional veil in white or black colors.

Music
Singing is part of Salar culture. A style of singing called Hua'er is shared among the Han, Hui, Salar and Tibetans in Qinghai province. They have a musical instrument called the Kouxuan. It is a string instrument manufactured in silver or in copper and only played by the women.

Language

The people of China and Salar themselves regard the Salar language as a Tujue language (Turk language) (突厥語言). The Salar language has two large dialect groups. The divergence is due to the fact that one branch in Xunhua county of Qinghai province and Gansu province was influenced by the Tibetan languages and Chinese and the other branch in Ili Kazakh Autonomous Prefecture by the Uyghur and Kazakh languages.

In the late 1990s, it was estimated that out of the some 89,000 Salars, around 60,000 spoke the Salar language.

Most Salar do not use any written script for the Salar language, instead they use Chinese characters for practical purposes. Salar serves as their spoken language, while Chinese serves as a both spoken and written language. Many of the current generation of Salars are fluent in Chinese and Tibetan.

The Salar language spoken in Amdo Tibet (Qinghai), has heavy Chinese and Tibetan influence. Although of Turkic origin, it's a mixed language today. Around 20% of the vocabulary is of Chinese origin and 10% is also of Tibetan origin. Morphological and syntactic structures have been fully borrowed from these latter languages. Yet, according to author William Safran, linguistic works published in China treat Salar as if it has few loanwords from these languages, omitting most Chinese and Tibetan features. The Salar use the Chinese writing system, though they have their own written language which, however, is used by very few people. Salar language has taken loans and influence from neighboring Chinese varieties. It is neighboring variants of Chinese which have loaned words to the Salar language. In Qinghai, many Salar men speak both the Qinghai dialect of Chinese and Salar. Rural Salars can speak Salar fluently while urban Salars often assimilate into the Chinese speaking Hui population.

In Ili Salar, the i and y high front vowels, when placed after an initial glides are spirantized with j transforming into ʝ. Qinghai and Ili Salar have mostly the same consonantal development.

Religion
Salars profess Sunni Islam (Hanafi Maturidites). In addition to their traditional places, they live in cities, mainly inhabited by other Muslims - Dungans. Islamic Education Received at Gaizi Mişit Madrasah in Jiezi Village.

Many Salar adhere to the Naqshbandi Sufi order, which spread throughout the region in the 17th and 18th centuries.

Genetics
The Y-DNA haplogroups and therefore the paternal genetic lineages of the Salar people, exhibit a mix of West Eurasian and East Asian haplogroups. Their maternal lineages are overwhelmingly East Asian. About 24–30% Y chromosomes of Salar belong to the East Asian specific haplogroup O3-M122, while the Central Asian, South Asian and European prevalent Y chromosomal lineage R-M17 comprises only 17%. Other Y-DNA haplogroups among the Salars are D1 and C3. Another study showed that the haplogroup O1b1a1a1b2 was also present in Salars.

An autosomal genetic study (Ma et al. 2021) estimated that West Eurasian-related admixture (represented by ancient Andronovo samples) among Salars was at ~9.1% to ~11.8%, with the remainder being dominant East Eurasian ancestry; might derive from "Yellow River Basin farmers" (YR_LBIA) or "Liao River farmers" (WLR_LN) at ~88.2 to ~90.9%. The study also showed that there is a close genetic affinity among ethnic minorities in Northwestern China (Uyghurs, Huis, Dongxiangs, Bonans, Yugurs and Salars) and that these cluster closely with other East Asian people, especially with other Chinese Turkic, Mongolic and Tungusic speakers, indicating the probability of a shared recent common ancestor of "Altaic speakers".

Literature

Notes

References

External links

 The Salar ethnic minority (Chinese government site); 
 Above also mirrored at: 
 Hasan Bulent Paksoy'in Turk Tarihi posted by Salar people
 Arienne M. Dwyer: Salar Grammatical Sketch (PDF)
 Ma Wei, Ma Jianzhong, and Kevin Stuart, editors. 2001. Folklore of China's Islamic ` Nationality. Lewiston, Edwin Mellen.
 Ma Quanlin, Ma Wanxiang, and Ma Zhicheng (Kevin Stuart, editor). 1993. Salar Language Materials. Sino-Platonic Papers. Number 43.
 Ma Wei, Ma Jianzhong, and Kevin Stuart. 1999. The Xunhua Salar Wedding. Asian Folklore Studies 58:31-76. https://doi.org/10.2307/1178890; https://www.jstor.org/stable/1178890
 Ma Jianzhong and Kevin Stuart. 1996. ‘Stone Camels and Clear Springs’: The Salar's Samarkand Origins. Asian Folklore Studies. 55:2, 287-298. https://doi.org/10.2307/1178823; https://www.jstor.org/stable/1178823
 Han Deyan (translated by Ma Jianzhong and Kevin Stuart). 1999. The Salar Khazui System. Central Asiatic Journal 43 (2): 204-214. https://www.jstor.org/stable/41928197
 Feng Lide and Kevin Stuart. 1991. Ma Xueyi and Ma Chengjun. Salazu Fengsuzhi [Records of Salar Customs]; Han Fude, general editor. Salazu Minjian Gushi [Salar Folktales]; Han Fude, general editor. Minjian Geyao [Folk Songs]; and Han Fude, general editor. Minjian Yanyu [Folk Proverbs]. Asian Folklore Studies. 50:2, 371-373.

 
Ethnic groups officially recognized by China
Muslim communities of China